Aaadonta pelewana is a species of snail, a terrestrial pulmonate gastropod mollusk in the family Endodontidae. It is found in Palau, where it was known from Peleliu and Koror. If it is still extant, it is threatened by the destruction and modification of its tropical moist lowland forest habitat.

References

Endodontoid land snails from Pacific Islands (Mollusca : Pulmonata : Sigmurethra). Alan Solem ... ; [collab.] Barbara K. Solem. Chicago, Ill. :Field Museum of Natural History,1976.

Endodontidae
Gastropods described in 1976
Endemic fauna of Palau